The Jingdong horned toad (Boulenophrys jingdongensis), or Jingdong spadefoot toad, is a species of frog in the family Megophryidae found in Yunnan and Guangxi, China. It is expected to also occur in northern Vietnam.
Its natural habitats are subtropical or tropical moist montane forests and rivers.
It is threatened by habitat loss.

References

Boulenophrys
Amphibians of China
Endemic fauna of China
Taxonomy articles created by Polbot
Amphibians described in 1983